Ish Kabibble (January 19, 1908 – June 5, 1994) was an American comedian and cornet player.

Early life
Born Merwyn Bogue in North East, Pennsylvania, he moved to Erie, Pennsylvania, with his family a few months after his birth.

Career
Bogue studied law at West Virginia University, but his comedy antics soon found an audience. He appeared in ten movies between 1939 and 1950. In Thousands Cheer (1943), he appeared with Kay Kyser and sang "I Dug a Ditch," and he also appeared as a vocalist in That's Right—You're Wrong (1939), You'll Find Out (1940), and Playmates (1941). In addition, he performed with Kyser on the radio and television quiz show Kay Kyser's Kollege of Musical Knowledge in 1949 and 1950.

 In his 1989 autobiography, Bogue explained his stage name, which he took from the lyrics of one of his comedic songs, "Isch ga-bibble."

The song derived from a mock-Yiddish expression, "Ische ga bibble?", which was purported to mean "I should worry?", prompting a curious (and perhaps not coincidental) association with the "What, me worry?" motto of Mad Magazine's mascot, Alfred E. Neuman.  While this derivation has been widely quoted on the Internet and elsewhere, the expression "ische ga bibble" is not Yiddish and in fact contains no Yiddish words at all.  However, there is a Yiddish expression, "nisht gefidlt," meaning "it doesn't matter to me," from which the term "ish kabibble" may derive.

Although Bogue's stage persona was that of a gangling goof, he was a notable cornet player and was also business manager for the Kay Kyser Orchestra for most of its existence. Kyser disbanded the orchestra during the summer of 1947 but resurrected it for a television series in October 1949. During the hiatus Spike Jones hired Bogue to appear as Ish Kabibble in Jones's zany band the City Slickers. Bogue didn't care for the experience, and was with the Jones band only briefly. Bogue was one of only four members of the Kyser band who returned for the TV show, which ran 14 months. Kyser retired from show business on Christmas Day, 1950, and the band broke up for good.

With the decline of the big bands, Bogue worked as a solo comedian or in partnership with his old Kyser associate Mike Douglas.

Personal life
Merwyn Bogue was known informally as "Mern." He married Janet Meade in 1932, and the couple had three children: Merwyn (known as Peter), born 1937; Pamela, 1940; and Janet, 1941.

In 1961 Bogue earned a license to sell real estate, and became successful in his new career. "I liked selling real estate," he recalled in his memoir. "In a sense, selling real estate is much the same as being in show business. Instead of talking to a large audience, I talk to a man and his wife. The applause happens when they write the check, and if they do not write the check, it means I did a lousy show." By 1973, Bogue and his wife were living in Hawaii. Bogue caused double-takes from prospective clients who saw his trademark haircut and read his business card: "Ish Kabibble, Sales Manager."

Bogue died in 1994 in Joshua Tree, California, of respiratory failure brought on by pulmonary disease and emphysema.

Cultural legacy

Kabibble's distinctive black hair in a bowl cut, similar to that used by Three Stooges member Moe Howard, is said to have been an inspiration for the hairstyle worn by Jim Carrey's character in Dumb and Dumber.

The name  "Ish Kabbible" was used for a hoax student supposedly enrolled at Princeton University in the 1950s.

Around 1983, Ish Kabibble was the voice recording for the animated series Challenge of the GoBots. This predecessor to the more popular Transformers series also had humans allied with both sides of feuding mechanical extraterrestrials. One example was Soviet Russian scientist Dr. Anya Turgenova. Towards the end of the pilot episode, she muttered, "Ishkabibble!" in boredom after hearing her friends' summoned to a U.S. federal government inquiry.

In 1985, the character's name was used as a plot device on the animated series The Thirteen Ghosts of Scooby-Doo when Scooby and the gang, along with an animated spoof of Vincent Price, go in search of the Amulet of Ish Kabibble.

In the TV show M*A*S*H, Alan Alda's character Hawkeye Pierce several times refers to Ish Kabibble. Once Pierce asks whom he and Trapper John should drink to—"MacArthur or Ish Kabibble?" Another time he refers to Ish Kabibble and his All-Girl Orchestra and refers to him as part of a dream. In the TV show Green Acres, Sam Drucker sells "Ish Kabibble" kazoos. In the "Cousin Maude's Visit" episode of All in the Family, Maude refers to how the name "Ish Kabibble" makes Archie Bunker laugh, in an automatic juvenile response.

In the animated sitcom Sit Down Shut Up, Ish Kabbible is referred to several times in one episode.

In the movie Photographing Fairies, Ish Kabbible is used a few times as a toast.

A children's book, "Ishkabibble!" by Dorothy Crayder, with art by Susan Vaeth was published in 1975. The word in the book is a nonsense motivational term, and is revealed to translate as "who cares?" as in the alleged etymology from above.

In the animated sitcom Family Guy the character, Lois (Alex Borstein), frequently uses the phrase in situations where she is unhappy.

The academic society known as The International Society for the History, Philosophy, and Social Studies of Biology goes by the acronym ISHPSSB, but the abbreviation is commonly pronounced ″ishkabibble″ at the suggestion of David Hull, as a homage to Bogue.

Kay Kyser and Ish Kabibble are caricatured as Kaynine Kyser and Ish Kyoodle in the Warner Bros. Merrie Melodies cartoon "Hollywood Canine Canteen."  Ish Kabibble recited a poem ("Roses are red / Violets are blue / If skunks had a college / They'd call it P.U.").

References

Further reading

External links
 

1908 births
1994 deaths
American male comedians
American trumpeters
American male trumpeters
Musicians from Erie, Pennsylvania
People from North East, Pennsylvania
American cornetists
20th-century American musicians
20th-century trumpeters
20th-century American comedians
20th-century American male musicians
West Virginia University alumni